Jeff Simmons (born August 5, 1976) is an American former race car driver who competed in the Indy Racing League.

Early career
Born in Hartford and grew up in East Granby, Simmons began his professional career in the Barber Dodge Pro Series in 1998. In his first season, he won the rookie of the year and the series championship, becoming only the second rookie ever to win the title. The "Career Enhancement Award" of $250,000 that went with the title was not enough to secure him a ride at the next level, Indy Lights, so he returned to Barber Dodge in 1999. He successfully defended his championship and in so doing became the only person ever to win the championship twice. With two "Career Enhancement Awards" ($500,000) behind him he moved up to the Indy Lights with Team Green in 2000, finishing 7th overall. When Michael Andretti joined Team Green to form Andretti Green Racing, the Indy Lights effort was disbanded. Simmons tested at the end of that year with the 2000 Indy Lights champs, PacWest Racing. However, Simmons’ lack of funding left him without a team for both 2001 and 2002. He made his return to racing in 2003 in the Infiniti Pro Series, leading his first race back and ultimately finishing 2nd in the championship with 2 wins. In 2004, Simmons once again lacked the sponsorship needed for a full-time ride, However, AJ Foyt put him in his Infiniti Pro Series car at Indianapolis where the finished 2nd. That led to Mo Nunn giving him a chance to qualify his second car for the Indianapolis 500, which he did, with just 37 laps ever in an IndyCar, and finished 16th in the race. He made one additional start that year for Patrick Racing after the retirement of Al Unser Jr. at Kansas Speedway. He put the Patrick car in the highest position it had seen all year and was set to record a top-10 when he was taken out by two of his competitors. Unable to find a ride in IndyCar for 2005, he returned to the Pro Series, finishing second in the series championship with 4 victories for Team ISI/Kenn Hardley Racing.

IndyCar Series

Expecting another season in the Pro Series in 2006, those plans were turned upside down when Paul Dana was killed in a practice crash before the first IndyCar series race at Homestead-Miami Speedway on a weekend where Simmons won the IPS race.

Simmons was rewarded for his resilience when Rahal Letterman Racing announced April 4, 2006, he would drive the No. 17 Ethanol-sponsored Panoz–Honda effective April 22 in Motegi and was eligible to compete for the Rookie of the Year award, although he was no longer an Indy 500 rookie due to his start in 2004.  He contested the remainder of the 2006 IRL IndyCar Series season and finished 16th in series points despite missing the first two races. His best finish in 2006 was 7th place at Nashville Superspeedway and Infineon Raceway.

For the 2007 season, Simmons was joined at Rahal Letterman by IRL veteran Scott Sharp. The season saw the team hampered by engineering and mechanical issues ultimately resulting in a lawsuit by Sharp against the team and its owners. Simmons led the Indianapolis 500 that year and ran in the top-5 most of the race until rain forced an early end to the event and Simmons to finish in 11th. On July 19, after 11 races, Simmons was let go from the team, who replaced him with fellow American Ryan Hunter-Reay.

In February 2007, Jeff became engaged to WTHR Sunrise reporter, Stephanie Soviar. They were married in September of that year, but ended up getting divorced in April 2010.

Simmons returned to the Indy Lights Series (formerly the Indy Pro Series) at the beginning of the 2008 season, driving for Team Moore Racing. He was given a chance to return to the IndyCar Series, albeit temporarily, to drive a second entry for A. J. Foyt Enterprises in the 2008 Indianapolis 500 and qualified 24th. He quickly moved up the field in the race until a pit lane incident damaged the car. A mechanical failure finally sent him into the wall during a caution period, resulting in a 28th-place finish.

Motorsports Career Results

American open–wheel racing results
(key) (Races in bold indicate pole position)

Complete USF2000 National Championship results

Barber Dodge Pro Series

Indy Lights

Indy Pro Series

IndyCar Series

 1 Run on same day.
 2 Non-points race.

Indianapolis 500

References

1976 births
Living people
Sportspeople from Hartford, Connecticut
Racing drivers from Connecticut
North American Formula Renault drivers
IndyCar Series drivers
Indianapolis 500 drivers
Indy Lights drivers
Formula Palmer Audi drivers
Barber Pro Series drivers
U.S. F2000 National Championship drivers
A. J. Foyt Enterprises drivers
Rahal Letterman Lanigan Racing drivers
Mo Nunn Racing drivers
Team Moore Racing drivers
Andretti Autosport drivers